Rousselia is a genus of flowering plants belonging to the family Urticaceae.

Its native range is south-eastern Mexico to Colombia and the Caribbean. It is found in Belize, Colombia, Cuba, Dominican Republic, El Salvador, Guatemala, Haiti, Jamaica, the Leeward Islands, Nicaragua, Puerto Rico and the Windward Islands.

It was first described and published in Voy. Uranie on page 503 in 1830.

Known species
According to Kew:
Rousselia cubensis 
Rousselia erratica 
Rousselia humilis 
Rousselia impariflora

References

Urticaceae
Urticaceae genera
Plants described in 1830
Flora of Southeastern Mexico
Flora of Central America
Flora of the Caribbean
Flora of Colombia